Dereck J. Hogan is an American diplomat who served as United States Ambassador to Moldova. He currently serves as Principal Deputy Assistant Secretary in the Bureau of European and Eurasian Affairs.

Education
Hogan received a Bachelor of Arts degree from University of Pittsburgh and a Master of Public Affairs in International Relations from the Woodrow Wilson School at Princeton University.

Career
Hogan is a career member of the Senior Foreign Service. He has been working for the State Department since 1997. He has served at multiple capacities including being the Deputy Chief of Mission and Chargé d'Affaires at the U.S. Embassy in Azerbaijan, Director of the office of Nordic and Baltic Affairs in the Department's Bureau of European and Eurasian Affairs and has worked in U.S. embassies in Belarus, Dominican Republic and Nicaragua. He was also Special Assistant to Secretary of State Colin Powell.

United States Ambassador to Moldova
On June 22, 2018, President Trump nominated Hogan to be the next United States Ambassador to Moldova. On September 6, 2018, the Senate confirmed his nomination by voice vote. He presented his credentials to the President of Moldova on November 2, 2018. Ambassador Hogan was well liked and respected in his role, and is one of the most favorite and successful Ambassadors to Moldova. His respect for the local country and language was well noticed and appreciated (he spoke the language almost fluently in such a short time).

Bureau of European and Eurasian Affairs 
Hogan has served as Principal Deputy Assistant Secretary in the Bureau of European and Eurasian Affairs since September 2, 2021, succeeding Maureen Cormack, who became Acting Assistant Secretary.

Personal life
Hogan and his wife, Anny, have one daughter. He speaks Russian, Romanian and Spanish.

See also
List of ambassadors of the United States
List of ambassadors appointed by Donald Trump

References 

Year of birth missing (living people)
Place of birth missing (living people)
Living people
University of Pittsburgh alumni
Princeton School of Public and International Affairs alumni
People from New Jersey
United States Foreign Service personnel
21st-century American diplomats
Ambassadors of the United States to Moldova